Memory of water may refer to:

Memory of Water (film), (Spanish: La memoria del agua), a 1994 Spanish-Argentine drama film directed by Héctor Fáver
Memory of Water, a novel by Finnish author Emmi Itäranta
The Memory of Water, a comedy by English playwright Shelagh Stephenson
The Memory of Water (film),  a 2015 Chilean drama film written and directed by Matías Bize
Water memory, a refuted theory behind homeopathic remedies